The British Society of Aesthetics (BSA) is a philosophical organization founded by Herbert Read in 1960 to promote the study of aesthetics. The BSA sponsors national and regional conferences, and publishes the British Journal of Aesthetics, Debates in Aesthetics (formerly The Postgraduate Journal of Aesthetics), as well as a newsletter. The organization also funds projects that promote the goals of the BSA. The Society holds an annual conference at St Anne's College in Oxford.

References

External links 
 British Society of Aesthetics website

Aesthetics organizations
Philosophical societies in the United Kingdom
1960 establishments in the United Kingdom
Organizations established in 1960